Lake Mzingazi Dam is a dam on the Mzingazi River, near Richards Bay, KwaZulu-Natal, South Africa. It was established in 1942.

See also
List of reservoirs and dams in South Africa
List of rivers of South Africa

References 
 List of South African Dams from the Department of Water Affairs and Forestry (South Africa)

Dams in South Africa
Dams completed in 1942
1942 establishments in South Africa